Mariamman Temple is a Hindu temple in the town of Valangaiman in the Tiruvarur district of Tamil Nadu, India.

References 
 

Hindu temples in Tiruvarur district